Sandilands railway station co-served the town of Lanark, in the historical county of Lanarkshire, Scotland, from 1864 to 1964 on the Douglas Branch.

History 
The station was opened on 1 April 1864 by the Caledonian Railway. It was named after the nearby Sandilands Farm. On the east side was the goods yard and in between the loop and the sidings was the signal box. This was replaced by a ground frame in 1937. The station closed on 5 October 1964.

References 

Disused railway stations in South Lanarkshire
Former Caledonian Railway stations
Beeching closures in Scotland
Railway stations in Great Britain opened in 1864
Railway stations in Great Britain closed in 1964
1864 establishments in Scotland
1964 disestablishments in Scotland